Elections to the Legislative Assembly of the Indian state of Madhya Bharat were held on 26 March 1952. 440 candidates contested for the 79 constituencies in the Assembly. There were 20 two-member constituencies and 59 single-member constituencies. The Indian National Congress won a majority of seats and Mishrilal Gangwal became the new Chief Minister.

Results

!colspan=8|
|- style="background-color:#E9E9E9; text-align:center;"
! class="unsortable" |
! Political party !! Flag !! Seats  Contested !! Won !! % of  Seats !! Votes !! Vote %
|- style="background: #90EE90;"
| 
| style="text-align:left;" |Indian National Congress
| 
| 99 || 75 || 75.76 || 9,38,918 || 47.24
|-
| 
| style="text-align:left;" |Socialist Party
|
| 59 || 4 || 4.04 || 1,45,845 || 7.34
|-
| 
| style="text-align:left;" |Bharatiya Jana Sangh
|
| 42 || 4 || 4.04 || 1,93,627 || 9.74
|-
| 
| style="text-align:left;" |Akhil Bharatiya Ram Rajya Parishad
|
| 39 || 2 || 2.02 || 1,43,132 || 7.20
|-
| 
| style="text-align:left;" |Akhil Bharatiya Hindu Mahasabha
|
| 33 || 11 || 11.11 || 2,36,824 || 11.92
|-
| 
|
| 131 || 3 || 3.03 || 2,58,157 || 12.99
|- class="unsortable" style="background-color:#E9E9E9"
! colspan = 3| Total seats
! 99 !! style="text-align:center;" |Voters !! 57,23,673 !! style="text-align:center;" |Turnout !! 19,87,410 (34.72%)
|}

Elected Members

State Reorganization and Merger
On 1 November 1956, under States Reorganisation Act, 1956, All districts of Madhya Bharat, except the Sunel enclave of the Mandsaur district, was merged into Madhya Pradesh. The Sunel enclave of the Mandsaur district was merged in Rajasthan.

See also

 Madhya Bharat
 1951–52 elections in India
1952 Bhopal Legislative Assembly election
1952 Vindhya Pradesh Legislative Assembly election
 1952 Madhya Pradesh Legislative Assembly election
 1957 Madhya Pradesh Legislative Assembly election

References

State Assembly elections in Madhya Pradesh
1950s in Madhya Pradesh
Madhya Bharath
Madhya Bharat
March 1952 events in Asia